214th may refer to:

214th (Saskatchewan) Battalion, CEF, a unit in the Canadian Expeditionary Force during the First World War
214th Fires Brigade (United States), an artillery brigade in the United States Army
214th Infantry Brigade (United Kingdom), an infantry brigade, fought in Northwestern Europe in World War II
214th Infantry Division (Germany), a German division in World War II
214th Reconnaissance Group, a group of the United States Air Force located at Davis-Monthan Air Force Base, Arizona
214th Reconnaissance Squadron, a unit of the Arizona Air National Guard

See also
214 (number)
214, the year 214 (CCXIV) of the Julian calendar
214 BC
214 (disambiguation)